Randy Pedersen (born May 28, 1962) is an American sportscaster and former professional bowler. He is currently a color analyst for Fox Sports' coverage of the PBA Tour, formerly filling that same role on ESPN and CBS Sports Network telecasts of the PBA Tour in previous seasons. During the most recent season, he worked alongside play-by-play announcers Rob Stone and Dave Ryan, having previously worked with Dave LaMont, Lon McEachern and Mike Jakubowski. Pedersen grew up in Southern California, but relocated to Clermont, Florida in the early 1990s. He has resided in Florida ever since. He and his ex-wife Becky have two children: a son, Chad and a daughter, Savannah.

Bowling career
As a bowler, Pedersen won 13 PBA Tour titles, with 11 of them coming in a ten-season stretch between 1986 and 1995, when he was one of the top players on tour. Pedersen captured the prestigious PBA National Championship crown in 1987 for his first and only major title. He won three titles in the 1989 season, but was beaten out for PBA Player of the Year honors by Amleto Monacelli, who won four titles that year. His last title was earned at age 40 in the 2002 Pepsi Open. That title pushed him over the $1 million career earnings mark, making him the 24th career millionaire in PBA history at the time.

Pedersen is also known for having suffered from two of the worst breaks in PBA Tour history. Both came in major tournaments, and both times he lost by one pin. He lost the 1995 Bayer-Brunswick Touring Players Championship to veteran Ernie Schlegel by a 237–236 score. Needing a strike and then six pins in the tenth frame to win, Pedersen left a solid 8 pin standing on what appeared to be a perfect 1-3 pocket shot. That match is also remembered for Schlegel's joyful-spirited but largely unprofessional and unsportsmanlike reaction. In a thrill-of-victory/agony-of-defeat moment, Schlegel ran around in front of the crowd with his fists raised, as Pedersen fell down onto the approach, covering his face in disappointment. Pedersen was also knocked out of the 2005 Dexter Tournament of Champions after he left the 7 pin on his tenth frame fill shot to close out the semifinal against Norm Duke, losing 256–255.

Pedersen was ranked #35 on the PBA's 2008 list of "50 Greatest Players of the last 50 years." He was elected to the PBA Hall of Fame in October, 2010, and was inducted with the 2011 class on January 22, 2011.

Pedersen joined the PBA50 Tour (formerly PBA Senior Tour) in 2013, and on May 16 of that year he won the very first tournament he entered: the PBA50 Dayton Classic.

PBA Tour titles
Major titles in bold type.

 1986 AC-Delco Classic (Union City, California)
 1987 Toledo Trust PBA National Championship (Toledo, Ohio) 
 1987 Fair Lanes Open (Washington, D.C.)
 1988 Senior/Touring Pro Doubles Championship w/Carmen Salvino (Cheektowaga, New York)
 1989 AC-Delco Classic (Torrance, California)
 1989 Budweiser Classic (Miami, Florida)
 1989 Oranamin C Japan Cup (Tokyo, Japan)
 1990 Quaker State Open (Grand Prairie, Texas)
 1993 Billy Vuckovich III Memorial Fresno Open (Fresno, California)
 1994 Greater Harrisburg Open (Mechanicsburg, Pennsylvania)
 1995 Ebonite Kentucky Classic (Louisville, Kentucky)
 1999 Indianapolis Open (Indianapolis, Indiana)
 2002 Pepsi Open (Springfield Twp., Pennsylvania)

Television and film

Off the lanes, Pedersen joined ESPN in 2001 as a TV analyst and has had great success behind the microphone; Pedersen earned the position after getting his start in broadcasting as a lane-level reporter on ABC's Pro Bowlers Tour, in addition to working on Fox Sports Net for a brief time in 2000. Pedersen remained as the bowling analyst on ESPN through the termination of their PBA contract in 2018. He began working for Fox Sports in 2019 when the PBA Tour moved its TV broadcasts to Fox Sports networks. He has also served as analyst on selected PBA Tour broadcasts hosted by CBS Sports Network.

Pedersen has been lauded for his extensive knowledge of the game, associated bowling lingo and catch phrases (see below) as well as his sense of humor. He had a small part in the 1996 comedy movie Kingpin (he was placed right next to Woody Harrelson) along with several other professional bowlers, and has a cameo appearance in the 2006 bowling documentary A League of Ordinary Gentlemen.

Famous phrases 
Pedersen is notable for using various phrases used to describe different occurrences during PBA events. They include:

"Dead flush perfect!"
"He absolutely pure'd it."
(above two describing a perfectly-rolled strike, with all 10 pins going into the pit)

"Nothin' left but pin shrapnel!"
"Pulls the string on all 10 of 'em there."
"Shreds the rack!"
"That was filthier than a truck stop restroom!"
(above four have been used to describe a powerful strike)
"Bartender, make it a double!"(sometimes shouted when a player throws back-to-back strikes)
"BAD mammal!"(Pedersen uses this term either to describe a bowler on a hot streak, or serious pin carry when a less-than-perfect shot takes out all ten pins)
"Winner winner, Chicken dinner!" (referring to the winner of a match)
"Give me some coffee to go with that sweet roll!" (referring to a nicely rolled strike shot)
"That one went out for a burger and fries, and came back with steak and a baked potato." (referring to a shot that rolls out close to the gutter and hooks back for a pocket strike)
"That 6 pin just slapped the 10 pin silly!" (referring to a strike that could have been a solid 10, but the 6 pin goes off to the sidewall and hits the 10, knocking it down)
"The 10 pin gets sent to the blue tent" (comparing a 10 pin taken out by a strong "messenger" pin to an NFL player being sent to the concussion protocol tent)
"He's cooler than a polar bear's feet" (describing a player who calmly makes a clutch shot under pressure)
"Are you kidding me?"
"It's wetter than an otter's pocket out there" (referring to an "out of bounds" area on the lane near the gutters that has so much oil, the ball will not hook back)

Pedersen once commented on his role as PBA Analyst on ESPN telecasts. He said, "I want to convey to the viewing public that they are watching the best bowlers in the world. It's my job to explain what makes them that good, as well as provide other information that 'Johnny 150 average' doesn't already know. One thing I learned is if you can bring enthusiasm to the table, sometimes it doesn't really matter what is coming out of your mouth. The viewing audience senses the enthusiasm."

References

American ten-pin bowling players
American sports announcers
Living people
Bowling broadcasters
People from California
People from Clermont, Florida
1962 births